Paulo Henrique Araújo de Holanda Montenegro (born April 15, 1985, Mossoró) is a Brazilian singer and songwriter.

Career
Montenegro has been singing since childhood, having joined a kids' choir in mid school, where he first received vocal training. In 2009 in a partnership with DJ Alahin, he released his first single on iTunes, an original English pop song entitled Gasoline Love, which was written and produced by himself. In 2010 he started collaborating with singer Natalia Damini writing some of her songs, including her first hit Feeling the Love. In 2011, Montenegro started uploading several videos on his YouTube channel, singing in English, Spanish, Chinese, Japanese and Korean.

His cover of 'First Love' by Hikaru Utada caught the attention of TV staff in Japan and he was invited to take part in an international singing competition called Nodojiman THE World! (のどじまんTHEワールド!) broadcast from Japan, by the TV Channel Nippon TV in March 2015.  Despite not being a native Japanese speaker, he performed two Japanese songs on the show in front of live audience and judges. The first of the two songs was the Rainy Blue by Hideaki Tokunaga and the second song was the aforementioned First Love which he performed in the final round of top 6.

Personal life
Montenegro is the first child of City Councilwoman Izabel Montenegro and he has been living in Ceará, Brazil for the last 10 years. Besides singing, he also works as a blogger/writer for the website MobileXpert where he writes articles about technology and software and also produces reviews on mobile devices and apps.

References

External links
 Coluna do J.Belmont
 "A voz do Brasil Em Japonês" (Blog do Carlos Santos)
 De Mossoró para o Japão
 Mossoroense participará de programa de calouros Japonês (O Mossoroense)
 Mention on a local Brazilian Newspaper (Gazeta do Oeste)
 TV show "Tudo por Elas" (TV Diário) 

21st-century Brazilian male singers
21st-century Brazilian singers
1985 births
Living people
People from Mossoró